Ali Mamlouk (born 19 February 1946) is a special security adviser to Syrian president Bashar al-Assad and is one of his trusted men. Mamlouk is also head of the National Security Bureau of the Ba'ath Party.

Early life
Ali Mamluk was born in Damascus into a Sunni family on 19 February 1946. There is another report giving his birth year as 1945. His family is originally from İskenderun (Hatay in Turkey).

Career
Mamlouk is said to be one of the founding officers of the Syrian Air Force Intelligence in the 1970s. He was deputy director there, when in June 2005 President Bashar Assad appointed him head of the General Security Directorate.

Mamlouk is said to be on good terms with all of Syria's intelligence agencies; the heads of the Air Force Intelligence Directorate and the Political Security Directorate were once his assistants. In July 2012 following the Damascus security HQ bombing, it was reported that Mamlouk would become the head of the National Security Bureau with the rank of minister overseeing the entire security apparatus, and that former military intelligence chief Abdel-Fatah Qudsiyeh would become his assistant.

Controversy
Mamlouk is one of many officials sanctioned by the European Union for their alleged actions against protesters participating in the Syrian revolution. His agency had "repressed internal dissent, monitored individual citizens, and had been involved in the Syrian government's Siege of Daraa, where protesters were killed by Syrian security services". In addition, he was added to the European Union's sanction list on 9 May 2011 on the grounds that he "involved in violence against demonstrators" during the war. Swiss government also put him into sanction list in September 2011. On 23 April 2012, the US government imposed sanctions on him, saying he had been responsible for human rights abuses, including the use of violence against civilians.

In May 2015, concern mounted regarding Mamlouk's whereabouts and health after not having been seen for some time, leading to comparisons with Rustum Ghazaleh who recently met a violent and unclear death.

In July 2015, Mamlouk visited Jeddah in Saudi Arabia and Muscat in Oman and met with Saudi and GCC officials to discuss proposals for ending the Syrian Civil War.

Criminal investigations

On 11 August 2012, Lebanon indicted Ali Mamlouk in absentia and former Lebanese Information Minister Michel Samaha for their alleged plots to assassinate Lebanese political and religious figures. Lebanese judicial officials issued a warrant for Mamlouk's arrest on 4 February 2013.

In November 2018, French prosecutors issued international arrest warrants for three senior Syrian intelligence and government officials: Ali Mamlouk, Abdel Salam Mahmoud and Jamil Hassan. The warrants bring charges including collusion in torture, forced disappearances, crimes against humanity and war crimes.

References

1946 births
Living people
People of the Syrian civil war
Syrian generals
Syrian Sunni Muslims